Felix Joseph Widder (16 December 1892 – 5 September 1974) was an Austrian mycologist, botanist, and naturalist.

Further reading

References

1892 births
1974 deaths
20th-century Austrian botanists
Austrian mycologists